Oland Cecil "Lou" Dials (January 10, 1904 – April 5, 1994) was an American baseball player in the Negro leagues. He played from 1925 to 1936 with several teams. He was the 1931 batting champ.  He played in the 1936 East-West All-Star Game. From 1938 to 1941, Dials played in the Mexican League. After his playing career, he became a scout for the Houston Astros, Cleveland Indians and Baltimore Orioles.

References

External links
 and Baseball-Reference Black Baseball stats and Seamheads

1904 births
1994 deaths
African-American baseball players
Akron Black Tyrites players
Baltimore Orioles scouts
Baseball first basemen
Baseball players from Missouri
Birmingham Black Barons players
Boston Red Sox scouts
Chicago American Giants players
Cleveland Giants players
Cleveland Indians scouts
Detroit Stars players
Homestead Grays players
Memphis Red Sox players
New York Black Yankees players
Philadelphia Hilldale Giants players
Santa Barbara City Vaqueros baseball players
Sportspeople from Hot Springs, Arkansas
20th-century African-American sportspeople